Eremiaphila is a genus of mantises in the family Eremiaphilidae.

Species
Eremiaphila ammonita
Eremiaphila andresi
Eremiaphila anubis
Eremiaphila arabica
Eremiaphila aristidis
Eremiaphila audouini
Eremiaphila barbara
Eremiaphila berndstiewi
Eremiaphila bifasciata
Eremiaphila bovei
Eremiaphila braueri
Eremiaphila brevipennis
Eremiaphila brunneri (common desert mantis)
Eremiaphila cairina
Eremiaphila cerisyi
Eremiaphila collenettei
Eremiaphila cordofana
Eremiaphila cycloptera
Eremiaphila dagi
Eremiaphila dentata
Eremiaphila denticollis
Eremiaphila foureaui
Eremiaphila fraseri
Eremiaphila genei
Eremiaphila gigas
Eremiaphila hebraica
Eremiaphila heluanensis
Eremiaphila irridipennis
Eremiaphila khamsini
Eremiaphila kheychi
Eremiaphila klunzingeri
Eremiaphila laeviceps
Eremiaphila lefebvrii
Eremiaphila luxor
Eremiaphila maculipennis
Eremiaphila monodi
Eremiaphila moretii
Eremiaphila murati
Eremiaphila mzabi
Eremiaphila nilotica
Eremiaphila nova
Eremiaphila numida
Eremiaphila persica
Eremiaphila petiti
Eremiaphila pierrei
Eremiaphila pyramidum
Eremiaphila rectangulata
Eremiaphila reticulata
Eremiaphila rohlfsi
Eremiaphila rotundipennis
Eremiaphila rufipennis
Eremiaphila rufula
Eremiaphila savignyi
Eremiaphila somalica
Eremiaphila spinulosa
Eremiaphila tuberculifera
Eremiaphila turica
Eremiaphila typhon
Eremiaphila uvarovi
Eremiaphila voltaensis
Eremiaphila werneri
Eremiaphila wettsteini
Eremiaphila yemenita
Eremiaphila zetterstedti (desert pebble mantis)

See also
List of mantis genera and species

References

 
Eremiaphilidae
Mantodea genera